Carolyn is a female given name, a variant of Caroline. Other spellings include Karolyn, Carolyne, Carolynn or Carolynne. Caroline itself is one of the feminine forms of Charles.

List of Notable People

Carolyn Bennett (born 1950), Canadian politician
Carolyn Bertozzi (born 1966), American chemist and Nobel laureate
Carolyn Bessette-Kennedy (1966–1999), wife of John F. Kennedy, Jr.
Carolyn Brown (choreographer) (born 1927), American dancer, choreographer, and writer
Carolyn Brown (newsreader), English newsreader
Carolyn Cassady (1923–2013), American writer and wife of Neal Cassady
C. J. Cherryh (Carolyn Janice Cherryh; born 1942), American science fiction and fantasy writer
Carolyn Chiechi (born 1943), judge of the United States Tax Court
Carolyn Cooper (born 1959), Jamaican author and literary scholar
Carolyn Davidson, several people
Carolyn Eaton, murder victim
Carolyn Fe, Filipina singer and actress
Carolyn Forché (born 1950), American poet, editor, translator and human rights advocate
Carolyn Franklin (1944–1988), American singer and songwriter, sister of Aretha Franklin
Carolyn Gray, Canadian Playwright
Carolyn Harris (born 1960), British politician
Carolyn Lynnet Harris (1948–1994), US librarian
Carolyn Wilson Harris (1849–1910), US lichenologist
Carolyn Hart (born 1936), American mystery writer
Carolyn Hax (born 1966), American writer and advice columnist
Carolyn Price Horton (1909-2001), American bookbinder and conservator
Carolyn Hunt (born 1937), American educator, politician, and First Lady of North Carolina
Carolyn Dawn Johnson (born 1971), Canadian country music singer-songwriter
Carolyn Jones (1930–1983), American actress
Carolyn Jones (politician), Canadian politician
Carolyn Jones-Young (born 1969), American former basketball player
Carolyn Cheeks Kilpatrick (born 1945), American politician
Carolyn Kizer (1925–2014), Pulitzer Prize-winning American poet
Carolyn Lawrence (born 1967), American voice actress
Carolyn Leigh (1926–1983), American lyricist
Carolyn Maloney (born 1946), American politician
Carolyn Martin (born 1951), American academic, author and president of Amherst College
Carolyn McCarthy (born 1944), American politician
Carolyn McCormick (born 1959), American actress
Carolyn McCurdie, British-born New Zealand author
Carolyn Morris (1925–1996), pitcher in the All-American Girls Professional Baseball League
Carolyn Omine (fl. 1990s–2020s), American television writer and producer
Carolyn Miller Parr (born 1937), judge of the United States Tax Court
Carolyn Parrish (born 1946), Canadian former politician
Carolyn Porco (born 1953), American planetary scientist
Carolyn Reidy (1949–2020), president and CEO of the American publishing company Simon & Schuster
Carolyn See (1934–2016), American author and reviewer
Carolyn Seymour (born 1947), English actress
Carolyn Shelby (born 1976), American micronationalist
Carolyn S. Shoemaker (1929–2021), American astronomer
Carolyn Watkinson (born 1949), English mezzo-soprano singer
Carolyn D. Wright (1949–2016), American poet
Carolyn Yarnell (born 1961), American composer and visual artist

In fiction
Carolyn Barek, on the television series Law & Order: Criminal Intent
Carolyn Keene, pseudonym of the authors of the Nancy Drew and The Dana Girls mystery stories
Carolyn Stoddard, from the soap opera Dark Shadows
Princess Carolyn, from the adult animation series Bojack Horseman

See also

Carolan (surname)
Caroly (name)
"Carolyna"
Carolyne
Carolynn
Karolyn

English feminine given names
Scottish feminine given names